Adevărul Holding is a media joint stock company owned by Romanian businessman and politician Dinu Patriciu and named after its main publication, the daily newspaper Adevărul. It currently owns newspapers and magazines, and has a television license. In addition to its main trademark Adevărul, its cultural supplement Adevărul Literar şi Artistic and other related media, the holding owns the daily tabloid Click!, the cultural weekly Dilema Veche and its sister magazine Dilemateca, the international policy magazine Foreign Policy Romania, and the Romanian edition of Forbes magazine. Adevărul Holding also owns Blik, a tabloid published in Ukraine.

Adevarul Holding was founded in 5 september 2006 by ROMPETROL HOLDING S.A, with Dan Costache Patriciu being elected as a director. It has since entered insolvency in 2012, and is currently in the process of being reorganized. 

company financials,

Financials 
The company financials, updated as of 2022, based on the reports submitted by ADEVARUL HOLDING S.R.L. to the ministry of finance.

Mass media companies of Romania
Adevărul